The following is a timeline of the history of the city of Kano, Nigeria.

Prior to 20th century

 999 CE - Bagauda in power.
 1095 - City wall construction begins.
 1349 - Yaji I in power.
 1430 - Kano becomes capital of the Sultanate of Kano.
 1463 - Muhammad Rumfa in power.
 1480 - Gidan Rumfa (palace) built (approximate date).
 1807 - Sokoto jihad active; Kano becomes capital of the Kano Emirate.
 1819 - Ibrahim Dabo in power.
 1890s - Kano Chronicle compiled.
 1893 - Tukur-Yusufu succession conflict.

20th century

 1903 - February: British in power.
 1905 - Kano becomes capital of British colonial Northern Nigeria Protectorate.
 1909 - Nassarawa School established.
 1911 - Lagos-Kano railway begins operating.
 1930 - Kano Girls' School established.
 1931 - Daily Comet newspaper begins publication.
 1932 - Water and Electric Light Works inaugurated.
 1936 - Airport begins operating.
 1937 - Rex cinema opens.
 1951 - Masalla cin Jumma'an (mosque) built.
 1952
 Palace cinema opens.
 Population: 130,173.
 1953 - 1 May: Kano riot of 1953.
 1967 - City becomes capital of the newly established Kano State.
 1970 - Murtala Muhammad Mosque built in Fagge.
 1975 - Population: 399,000.
 1977 - Bayero University Kano established.
 1980
 Yan Tatsine religious unrest.
 Triumph newspaper begins publication.
 Hausawa mosque built.
 1982 - No Man's Land mosque and Yar Akwa mosque built.
 1985 - Population: 1,861,000 (urban agglomeration).
 1986 - Hotoro mosque built.
 1987 - Goron Dutse mosque built.
 1988 - Goron Dutse Islamiyya secondary school opens.
 1990
 Kano Pillars Football Club formed.
 Population: 2,095,000 (urban agglomeration).
 1995 - Population: 2,339,000 (urban agglomeration).
 1998 - Sani Abacha Stadium opens.
 2000 - Population: 2,602,000 (urban agglomeration).

21st century

 2006 - Population: 2,163,225 city; 2,828,861 metro.
 2010
 August: Flood.
 Population: 3,271,000 (urban agglomeration).
 2012 - 20 January: Boko Haram attack.
 2013
 Northwest University Kano opens.
 Mallam Aminu Kano International Airport remodelled.
 2014 - 18 May: Boko Haram attack.

See also

 Kano history
 List of rulers of Kano
 List of Governors of Kano State
 Timelines of other cities in Nigeria: Ibadan, Lagos, Port Harcourt

Bibliography

Arabic manuscripts
Arabic manuscripts documenting the history of Kano:
Tarikh Arbab Hadha al-balad al-Musamma Kano (The Kano Chronicle) (18th century)
Asl al-Wangariyin (The Wangara Chronicle) (1650)
Taqyid al-Akbar (The Jihad Chronicle) (1863)
Al Eelan fi Tarikh Kano (1933)
Wakar Bagauda (The Song of Bagauda) (oral narrative, written in Hausa Ajami script)

Published in 19th-20th centuries
 
 ; via Google Books
 
 
 
 
 
 

Published in 21st century
 
 
 
 
  (about Kano)

References

External links

 Map of Kano, 1851, by Heinrich Barth
  (Bibliography of open access  articles)
  (Images, etc.)
  (Images, etc.)
  (Bibliography)
  (Bibliography)
  (Bibliography)
 Kano Archive

Kano
kano